The Wicked Carabel (Spanish: El malvado Carabel) is a comedy novel by Wenceslao Fernández Flórez that has been adapted to film three times:

El malvado Carabel,  1935 film by Edgar Neville 
El malvado Carabel, 1956 film by Fernando Fernán Gómez.
El malvado Carabel, 1962 film by Rafael Baledón.